Tonja Yvette Buford-Bailey (born December 13, 1970, in Dayton, Ohio) is an American former athlete who competed mainly in the 400 meter hurdles. She competed as Tonja Buford until marrying Victor Bailey on October 28, 1995. In 1982, when she was 12 years old, she met former track runner Wilma Rudolph. She attended Meadowdale High School in Dayton and the University of Illinois.

Her best result came in the 1995 World Championships held in Gothenburg, Sweden where she won the silver medal in the 400-meter hurdles, losing to compatriot Kim Batten by only 0.01 seconds. With times of 52.61 and 52.62, both athletes went under Sally Gunnell's old world record of 52.74 from the previous edition of the World Championships. That time would remain Buford's personal best, and is still the ninth quickest of all time.

The following year, she competed for the United States in the 1996 Summer Olympics held in Atlanta, U.S., where she won the bronze medal in the 400 meter hurdles behind Jamaica's Deon Hemmings and Batten.

She went on to have some further successes, only just missing out on a bronze medal at the 2001 World Championships and winning her event at the IAAF Grand Prix Final that year.

Buford-Bailey is the men and women's track and field Sprint and Relay coach at the University of Texas, Austin, beginning in June 2013. Buford-Bailey was the head women's track and field coach at the University of Illinois, Urbana-Champaign. She has two children and her husband is Victor Bailey, a former American football player.

International competitions
All results regarding 400 metres hurdles.

(#) Indicates overall result in the qualifying heats (h) or semifinals (sf).

References

External links
 
 
 
 Tonja Buford-Bailey profile at USATF

1970 births
Living people
American female hurdlers
Athletes (track and field) at the 1992 Summer Olympics
Athletes (track and field) at the 1996 Summer Olympics
Athletes (track and field) at the 2000 Summer Olympics
Olympic bronze medalists for the United States in track and field
World Athletics Championships medalists
Medalists at the 1996 Summer Olympics
Sportspeople from Dayton, Ohio
Track and field athletes from Ohio
Athletes (track and field) at the 1995 Pan American Games
Pan American Games medalists in athletics (track and field)
Pan American Games silver medalists for the United States
Pan American Games bronze medalists for the United States
Goodwill Games medalists in athletics
Illinois Fighting Illini women's track and field athletes
Competitors at the 2001 Goodwill Games
Medalists at the 1991 Pan American Games
Medalists at the 1995 Pan American Games
20th-century American women
21st-century American women